The Life Engineered is the 2016 debut science fiction novel by Jean-François (J-F) Dubeau. The novel was published on March 1, 2016 through Inkshares. It is set in a future world populated by robots (called Ćapeks) after the disappearance of human beings.

Plot summary 
The story follows the beginnings of a newly formed Ćapek named Dagir and her journey as she tries to figure out who killed her mother.

Publishing history 
The Life Engineered was originally self-published through Amazon's CreateSpace platform where it did fair numbers. The story found its way onto Inkshares and was published after getting the full editing and design.

On The Life Engineereds publication day, Dubeau released an exclusive prequel story which eludes to the life of Demeter before the events depicted in the full novel.

Characters 
Many of the characters are based in the mythology of Earth, including Dagir.

Reception 
Rated 4 out of 5 stars by Andrew Long on SF Signal.

References

2016 Canadian novels
American science fiction novels
Canadian science fiction novels
2016 science fiction novels
Novels about robots
2016 debut novels
CreateSpace books